The 1980 Hang Ten 400 was an endurance race for Group C Touring Cars. The event, which was Round 2 of the 1980 Australian Championship of Makes was staged on 14 September 1980 over 109 laps of the 3.1 km Sandown Park circuit in Victoria, Australia, a total distance of 337.9 km.

The field was divided into the following four engine capacity classes:
 Class A : Over 3000 cc
 Class B : 2000 - 3000 cc
 Class C : 1601 - 2000 cc
 Class D : 0 - 1600 cc

Results

Note : Of the forty seven starters, twenty three were classified as finishers.
Of the ten for which the results are unknown, eight were non-finishers and the remaining two placed 21st and 22nd.

References

Further reading
 The Australian racing history of Ford, 1989, page 304
 The official racing history of Holden, 1988, pages 225-226 & 353

Motorsport at Sandown
Hang Ten
Pre-Bathurst 500